Mai Gehrke (born 10 May 1964) is a Danish mathematician who studies the theory of lattices and their applications to mathematical logic. She is a director of research for the French Centre national de la recherche scientifique (CNRS), affiliated with the Laboratoire J. A. Dieudonné (LJAD) at the University of Nice Sophia Antipolis.

Education
As a child, Gehrke was educated at a French school in Algiers, which used a Bourbakist and very abstract mathematics curriculum. As a high school student in Denmark, she spent a year as an exchange student in Houston studying painting, but was brought back to mathematics by a Polish mathematics teacher who taught her point-set topology according to the Moore method.

She earned her Ph.D. from the University of Houston in 1987. Her dissertation, Order Structure of Stone Spaces and the TD-axiom, was supervised by Klaus Hermann Kaiser.

Career
After postdoctoral study at Vanderbilt University, Gehrke joined the faculty of New Mexico State University in 1990. She moved to Radboud University Nijmegen in 2007, and to CNRS in 2011. From 2011 to 2017 her work for CNRS was associated with the Laboratoire d'Informatique Algorithmique: Fondements et Applications (LIAFA) at Paris Diderot University; in 2017 she moved to LJAD in Sophia Antipolis.

References

External links
Home page

1964 births
Living people
Danish mathematicians
French mathematicians
Danish women mathematicians
French women mathematicians
Mathematical logicians
University of Houston alumni
New Mexico State University faculty
Academic staff of Radboud University Nijmegen
Women logicians